Peter Daniel Munro (born June 14, 1975) is a former starting pitcher in Major League Baseball. He played with the Toronto Blue Jays (–) and Houston Astros (–). He batted and threw right-handed.

Career

Munro debuted with Toronto in 1999. He pitched in a combined 40 games in his two seasons with Toronto. After pitching in parts of two seasons, the Blue Jays sent Munro to the Texas Rangers as the player to be named later traded for Dave Martinez. He re-signed with the Rangers for the 2001 season. 

Munro signed with the Houston Astros before the 2002 season and split time between AAA and the majors, pitching to a career low 3.57 ERA in 19 games (14 starts). His career highlight came on June 11, when he combined with Houston pitchers Roy Oswalt, Kirk Saarloos, Brad Lidge, Octavio Dotel, and Billy Wagner to throw the first no-hitter against the New York Yankees in 45 years. The Astros sextet also set a major league record for the highest number of pitchers to throw a no-hitter. 

In 2003, Munro pitched the majority of the season out of the bullpen, appearing in 40 games while making 2 spot starts during the season. 

In his final season with Houston, he went 4–7 with a 5.15 ERA. Another highlight in Munro's career was in the 2004 NLCS, when he got the ball in Game 2 and Game 6 (In Game 6, he was picked to start over 7-time Cy Young Award winner Roger Clemens). After the season, he signed with the Minnesota Twins on a minor league deal.

Munro started  pitching for the Rochester Red Wings, the Triple-A affiliate of the Minnesota Twins. He signed with Uni-President Lions of Taiwan's Chinese Professional Baseball League in March , and was selected to the CPBL All-Star Game in July. Munro signed with the York Revolution of the independent Atlantic League for the  season, but was released after sustaining an injury.

See also

 List of Houston Astros no-hitters
 List of Major League Baseball no-hitters

References

External links
, or Pura Pelota  
Google News
Retrosheet

1975 births
Living people
American expatriate baseball players in Canada
American expatriate baseball players in Taiwan
Baseball players from New York (state)
Columbus Clippers players
Dunedin Blue Jays players
Houston Astros players
Leones del Caracas players
American expatriate baseball players in Venezuela
Leones del Escogido players
American expatriate baseball players in the Dominican Republic
Major League Baseball pitchers
New Orleans Zephyrs players
Northwest Florida State Raiders baseball players
Oklahoma RedHawks players
Pawtucket Red Sox players
Rochester Red Wings players
Sarasota Red Sox players
Syracuse SkyChiefs players
Toronto Blue Jays players
Trenton Thunder players
Utica Blue Sox players
Uni-President 7-Eleven Lions players
York Revolution players